This is a list of all senators who have served in the Nebraska Legislature since it became a unicameral body in 1937.

Records show that the apportionment of the legislative districts established for the 1936 election remained unchanged through the election of 1962. The boundaries of these districts were restricted to fall along county lines. In the election of 1962, the voters of Nebraska passed a measure to loosen the county-line boundary restriction and to increase the number of legislative districts from 43 to 49. This resulted in a new apportionment that renumbered all the existing districts and added two additional districts to Lancaster County, three additional districts to Douglas County, and one north of Douglas county. That plan went into effect for the election of 1964.

However, on June 15, 1964, the United States Supreme Court handed down Reynolds v. Sims, which held that state senate districts must be roughly equal in population. One month later, the U.S. District Court for the District of Nebraska in League of Nebraska Municipalities v. Marsh held that the portion of the 1962 amendment to the Nebraska Constitution allowing the Legislature to give consideration to area when redistricting was unconstitutional. This meant that the Legislature had to once again redraw the district boundaries in 1965 based solely on popularion. In July 1965, the Legislature approved a plan with newly apportioned districts which was upheld by the Nebraska Supreme Court in January 1966 and went into effect for the election of 1966. After 1966, the Nebraska Legislature conducts a process of redistricting every ten years after the decennial United States Census.

After its inception in 1937, members of the unicameral Nebraska legislature served for a term of two years, and all state legislative districts were up for reelection in every biennial election. However, another change adopted by the voters of Nebraska in the 1962 election was to increase the term of state senators from two to four years, and to stagger the election of state senators so that roughly half of the districts were up for election every two years. The election of 1964 was the last election in which all legislative districts were up for election at the same time. Odd-numbered districts elected senators to four-year terms, such that odd-numbered-district elections would coincide with United States presidential elections. Even-numbered districts elected senators in 1964 to two-year terms, such that even-numbered-district senators would be up for election again in 1966, in which they would be elected to four-year terms such that even-numbered-district elections would coincide with United States midterm elections.

Even though the Nebraska Legislature, as a nonpartisan body, officially recognizes no party affiliations, the party affiliations of individual members are still noted below when known for reference.

District 1
In the pre-1964 apportionment, what is now District 1 was also called District 1, and it consisted the counties of Johnson, Pawnee, and Richardson. In 1964, the district was expanded to include Nemaha. The district's boundaries were then changed in the 1966 reapportionment to exclude Pawnee County, but in the 1971 redistricting, Pawnee County was regained, as well as the southeastern corner of Gage County, but Johnson was excluded. From 1980 to 2010, the district grew in size to encompass parts of Johnson and Otoe counties, and in the ten years after the 1991 redistricting, it even included the southern third of Gage County. 

Today, District 1 covers Otoe, Johnson, Nemaha, Pawnee, and Richardson counties.

District 2
In the pre-1964 apportionment, what is now District 2 was also called District 2, and it consisted of the counties of Otoe and Nemaha. In 1964, the district was changed to consist of Otoe and Cass counties, and in the 1966 reapportionment it was changed yet again to only include the eastern half of Otoe and Cass counties. In the 1971 redistricting, District 2 was expanded to include more of Otoe and Cass counties and added most of Johnson County. In the 1981 redistricting, Johnson county was shifted back to District 1, and District 2 was drawn to include all of Cass County and the northern half of Otoe county. For the 1991, 2001, and 2011 redistrictings, District 2 continued to shrink in size by including less and less of Otoe County. 

Today, District 2 consists of only Cass County and a small portion of eastern Lancaster County.

District 3
In the pre-1964 apportionment, what is now District 3 was also called District 3, and it consisted of the entirety of Sarpy County. This remained the same in the 1964 reapportionment, but after the 1966 reapportionment, it was reduced to only include a portion of Sarpy County, which continued to be readjusted for population in subsequent redistrictings.

Today, District 3 still consists of a portion of Sarpy County.

District 4
What is now called District 4 was created when the legislature expanded from 43 to 49 districts in 1964, and it consisted of a portion of Douglas County. 

Today, District 4 still consists of a section of Douglas County, which has been readjusted for population in subsequent redistrictings.

District 5
In the pre-1964 apportionment, what is now District 5 was called District 8, and it included a section of Douglas County. 

Today, District 5 still consists of a section of Douglas County, which has been readjusted for population in subsequent redistrictings.

District 6
In the pre-1964 apportionment, what is now District 6 was called District 9, and it included a section of Douglas County. 

Today, District 6 still consists of a section of Douglas County, which has been readjusted for population in subsequent redistrictings.

District 7
In the pre-1964 apportionment, what is now District 7 was also called District 7, and it included of a section of Douglas County. 

Today, District 7 still consists of a section of Douglas County, which has been readjusted for population in subsequent redistrictings.

District 8
In the pre-1964 apportionment, what is now District 8 was called District 10, and it included a section of Douglas County. 

Today, District 8 still consists of a section of Douglas County, which has been readjusted for population in subsequent redistrictings.

District 9
In the pre-1964 apportionment, what is now District 9 was called District 6, and it included a section of Douglas County. 

Today, District 9 still consists of a section of Douglas County, which has been readjusted for population in subsequent redistrictings.

District 10
What is now called District 10 was created when the legislature expanded from 43 to 49 districts in 1964, and it consisted of a section of Douglas County.

Today, District 10 still consists of a portion of Douglas County, which has been readjusted for population in subsequent redistrictings.

District 11
In the pre-1964 apportionment, what is now District 11 was called District 5, and it included a section of Douglas County. 

Today, District 11 still consists of a section of Douglas County, which has been readjusted for population in subsequent redistrictings.

District 12
What is now called District 12 was created when the legislature expanded from 43 to 49 districts in 1964, and it consisted of a section of Douglas County.

Today, District 12 still consists of a section of Douglas County, which has been readjusted for population in subsequent redistrictings.

District 13
In the pre-1964 apportionment, what is now District 13 was called District 4, and it included a section of Douglas County. 

Today, District 13 still consists of a section of Douglas County, which has been readjusted for population in subsequent redistrictings.

District 14
What is now called District 14 was created when the legislature expanded from 43 to 49 districts in 1964. It originally consisted of the counties of Burt and Washington. In the 1966 reapportionment, it was moved completely into Douglas County. As a result of the 1981 redistricting, District 14 was moved completely into Sarpy County. 

Today, District 14 consists of a portion of Sarpy County, which has been readjusted for population in subsequent redistrictings.

District 15
In the pre-1964 apportionment, what is now District 15 was called District 11, and it consisted of the counties of Dodge and Washington. In the 1964 reapportionment, it was reduced to only include Dodge County. In the 1971 redistricting, it was reduced further to only include a southern portion of Dodge County, which included the city of Fremont. District 15 was then increased in subsequent redistrictings to include more of Dodge county until the 2001 redistricting, when it once again included the entirety of Dodge county.

Today, District 15 consists of all of Dodge County and the northwest corner of Douglas County.

District 16
In the pre-1964 apportionment, what is now District 16 was called District 12, and it consisted of the counties of Cuming and Burt. In 1964, District 16 was changed to include Cuming and Colfax counties. In the 1966 reapportionment, District 16 was moved eastward to consist of Thurston, Burt, and Washingotn counties. In the 1981 redistricting, it picked up a northeast corner of Cuming County, and in the 1991 redistricting, District 16 dropped Thurston County and expanded to include the majority of Cuming County. In the 2001 redistricting, it lost the south half of Washington County, regained Thurston County, and added the rest of Cuming County and all of Stanton County. In the 2011 redistricting, District 16 lost Thurston and Stanton counties and was made to consist of only the entirety of Cuming, Burt, and Washington counties.

Today, District 16 consists of all of Cuming, Burt, and Washington counties as well as the eastern half of Stanton County.

District 17
In the pre-1964 apportionment, what is now District 17 was called District 13, and it consisted of the counties of Dixon, Dakota, and Thurston. In the 1964 reapportionment, the district boundaries remained unchanged. In the 1966 reapportionment, District 17 lost Thurston County but gained Wayne County. In the 1971 redistricting, District 17 only lost a small northwest corner of Wayne County, and in 1981, it lost a little more area in that same corner. In the 1991 redistricting, District 17 was reorganized to include only a small eastern portion of Dixon County, the eastern half of Wayne County, a northern portion of Cuming County, and all of Dakota and Thurston Counties. In the 2001 redistricting, District 17 retained all of Dakota county and gained back all of Dixon and Wayne counties, but it lost Thurston County and its portions of Cuming County. As a result of the 2011 redistricting, it lost all of Dixon county and regained all of Thurston county.

Today, District 17 consists of a southern portion of Dixon county and all of Wayne, Dakota, and Thurston counties.

District 18
In the pre-1964 apportionment, what is now District 18 was called District 16, and it consisted of the counties of Wayne, Stanton, and Colfax. In 1964, the district gained Pierce County but lost Colfax County. In the 1966 reapportionment, District 18 was shifted to encompass all of Stanton, Colfax, and Cuming counties. In the 1972 redistricting, it gained the northern half of Dodge County, and in the 1981 redistricting, it only lost a small northeast corner of Cuming County. In 1991, District 18 was shifted to include a small southeastern corner of Knox County, the western half of Wayne County, most of Dixon County, and all of Cedar, Pierce, and Stanton counties. As a result of the 2001 redistricting, District 18 was moved completely to consist of eastern portions of Washington and Douglas counties. In the 2011 redistricting, it was shifted completely into Douglas County.

Today, District 18 consists solely of a portion of Douglas County, which has been adjusted for population in subsequent redistrictings.

District 19
In the pre-1964 apportionment, what is now District 19 was called District 14, and it consisted of the counties of Knox and Cedar. The district was unaffected by the 1964 reapportionment, but in the 1966 reapportionment, it gained a northern portion of Pierce County. In the 1971 redistricting, District 19 gained more area in Pierce County as well as a small part of the northwest corner of Wayne County, and in the 1981 redistricting, it gained all of Pierce County as well as a bit more of Wayne County in the northwest corner. During the 1991 redistricting process, the Legislature passed a plan that divided Madison County between two legislative districts (Districts 18 and 19), each of which included other counties as well. Citizens of Madison County challenged the constitutionality of the plan in the case Day v. Nelson, alleging that the Nebraska Constitution required legislative districts to follow county lines when a county has sufficient population to constitute a single district. The Nebraska Supreme Court sided with the citizens of Madison County, and therefore a new plan was approved by the legislature making District 19 to consist of only Madison County. The district boundary was unaffected in the 2001 redistricting, and in the 2011 redistricting, District 19 gained the northwest corner of Stanton County, but in the 2021 redistricting, the district lost its area in Stanton County but gained the southern half of Pierce County.

Today, District 19 consists of Madison County and the southern half of Pierce County.

District 20
In the pre-1964 apportionment, what is now District 20 was called District 27, and it consisted of the counties of Antelope and Boone. In the 1964 reapportionment, the counties of Garfield and Wheeler were added to the district. However, in the 1966 reapportionment, District 20 was moved completely to south central Douglas County. 

Today, District 20 still consists of a portion of south central Douglas County, which has been adjusted for population in subsequent redistrictings.

District 21
In the pre-1964 apportionment, what is now District 21 was called District 15, and it consisted of the counties of Pierce and Madison. In the 1964 reapportionment, it was reduced to only Madison County, but in the 1966 reapportionment, it regained the majority of Pierce County. In the 1971 redistricting, the district lost some of its area in Pierce County, and in the 1981 redistricting, it was once again reduced to only include Madison County. In the 1991 redistricting, District 21 was moved completely and reorganized to include the western portion of Douglas County, the eastern and southern portions of Saunders County, and the northwest corner of Lancaster County. In the 2001 redistricting, the district was reduced to only include southern Saunders County and northwest Lancaster County, and as a result of the 2011 redistricting, it was shifted completely into northwest Lancaster County.

Today, District 21 comprises the northern part of Lancaster County, including portions of the City of Lincoln.

District 22
In the pre-1964 apportionment, what is now District 22 was called District 26, and it consisted of the counties of Nance and Platte. The boundaries of the district were unaffected by the 1964 and 1966 reapportionments. In the 1971 redistricting, the southern half of Boone County was added to the district. In the 1981 redistricting, the district lost a very small portion in the southeast corner of Platte County and also lost the southwest quarter of Boone County, but in the 1991 redistricting, it gained back all of Platte county but lost more of Boone County. As a result of the 2001 redistricting, District 22 lost all of Nance county but gained the northern half of Colfax County. In the 2011 redistricting, it lost a portion of Colfax County but gained the majority of Stanton County. 

Today, District 22 consists of the western side of Stanton County and nearly all of Platte County (except a very small portion in the southeast corner). It no longer contains any portion of Colfax County.

District 23
In the pre-1964 apportionment, what is now District 23 was called District 17, and it consisted of the counties of Butler and Saunders. The boundaries of the district were unaffected by the 1964 and 1966 reapportionments. In the 1971 redistricting, an eastern part of Polk County was added to the district, and a southeastern part of Saunders County was lost. In 1981, the district was returned to including all of Butler and Saunders counties along with a very small southeastern portion of Platte County. As a result of the 1991 redistricting, District 23 was reorganized to include all of Butler and Colfax counties along with portions of Saunders, Polk, Platte, Dodge, and Cuming counties. In the 2001 redistricting, District 23 was reorganized yet again to include all of Butler County, most of Saunders County except a southern portion, and parts of Colfax, Douglas, and Sarpy counties. In the 2011 redistricting, District 23 was restored to include the entirety of Butler and Saunders counties along with most of Colfax county.

Today, District 23 consists of all of Colfax and Saunders Counties and most of Butler County, except for its western edge.

District 24
In the pre-1964 apportionment, what is now District 24 was also called District 24, and it consisted of the counties of York and Seward. The boundaries of the district were unaffected by the 1964 and 1966 reapportionments. In the 1971 redistricting, the southeastern corner of Polk County was added to the district, which remained the same after the 1981 redistricting. The portion of Polk County included in District 24 was then enlarged in the 1991 redistricting, enlarged further in the 2001 redistricting, and enlarged even further in the 2011 redistricting to include all of Polk County.

Today, District 24 consists of the entirety of Polk, Seward, and York counties along with the western side of Butler County and very small section of the southeast corner of Platte County.

District 25
In the pre-1964 apportionment, what is now District 25 was called District 18, and it consisted of a section of Lancaster County. In the 1966 reapportionment, District 25 was expanded to include a portion of Cass County. In the 1971 redistricting, it was expanded to include portions of Lancaster County outside the City of Lincoln along with portions of Saunders, Cass, Otoe, and Johnson counties. As a result of the 1981 redistricting, District 25 lost of all of its area outside Lancaster County and was made to consist of all the area of Lancaster county surrounding the districts that included portions of the City of Lincoln. In 1991, the district was reduced to only include the eastern side of Lancaster county, including parts of the city of Lincoln, and in the 2001 and 2011 redistrictings, District 25 was readjusted for population mostly in the northeastern corner of Lancaster County.

Today, District 25 consists of a portion of southeastern Lancaster County.

District 26
What is now called District 26 was created when the legislature expanded from 43 to 49 districts in 1964, and it consisted of a section of Lancaster County.

Today, District 26 still consists of a portion of Lancaster County, which has been readjusted for population in subsequent redistrictings. It mostly includes the northeast corner of the City of Lincoln.

District 27
In the pre-1964 apportionment, what is now District 27 was called District 19, and it consisted of a section of Lancaster County.

Today, District 27 still consists of a portion of Lancaster County, which has been readjusted for population in subsequent redistrictings. It mostly includes the southwest corner of the City of Lincoln.

District 28
What is now called District 28 was created when the legislature expanded from 43 to 49 districts in 1964, and it consisted of a section of Lancaster County.

Today, District 28 still consists of a portion of Lancaster County, which has been readjusted for population in subsequent redistrictings. It mostly includes the central part of the City of Lincoln.

District 29
In the pre-1964 apportionment, what is now District 29 was called District 20, and it consisted of a section of Lancaster County.

Today, District 29 still consists of a portion of Lancaster County, which has been readjusted for population in subsequent redistrictings. It mostly includes the south central portion of the City of Lincoln.

District 30
In the pre-1964 apportionment, what is now District 30 was called District 21, and it consisted of Gage County. The district's boundaries were unaffected in the reapportionment of 1964; however, in the reapportionment of 1966, it was shifted slightly to include most of Gage County except for the western edge, and Pawnee County was added to it. In the 1971 redistricting, District 30 was modified again by dropping Pawnee County completely, regaining the western edge of Gage County but losing the southeastern corner, and adding portions of Saline and Jefferson counties. As a result of the 1981 redistricting, the district was reorganized to include all of Gage County and only the southeastern corner of Jefferson County. In the 1991 redistricting, District 30 began to gain area in southern Lancaster County; it also lost the bottom third of Gage County and regained the southeastern corner of Saline County and more area in Jefferson County. After the 2001 redistricting, District 30 consisted of all of Gage County and a portion of southern Lancaster County, which continued to be adjusted for population in subsequent redistrictings.

Today, District 30 consists of all of Gage County and a southeastern slice of Lancaster County.

District 31
In the pre-1964 apportionment, what is now District 31 was called District 22, and it consisted of the counties of Thayer and Jefferson. In the 1964 reapportionment, the district lost Thayer County and gained Saline County. In the 1966 reapportionment, the western edge of Gage County was added to the district. In the 1971 redistricting, the district was moved completely to south central Douglas County.

Today, District 31 still consists of a portion of south central Douglas County, mostly in the Millard area, which has been adjusted for population in subsequent redistrictings.

District 32
In the pre-1964 apportionment, what is now District 32 was called District 23, and it consisted of the counties of Fillmore and Saline. In the 1964 reapportionment, the district lost Saline County but gained Clay and Thayer counties. District 32 was unaffected by the 1966 reapportionment. In the 1971 redistricting, District 31 lost Clay County, but it gained most of Saline County and half of Jefferson County. In the 1981 redistricting, the district gained all of Saline County and most of Jefferson County except for the southeast corner. As a result of the 1991 redistricting, District 31 lost portions of Saline and Jefferson counties but gained the eastern side of Nuckolls County. In the 2001 redistricting, District 31 lost its area in Nuckoklls County and was adjusted to include all of Fillmore, Saline, Thayer, and Jefferson counties. In the 2011 redistricting, the district gained a portion of southwestern Lancaster County.

Today, District 32 consists of the entirety of Fillmore, Thayer, Saline, and Jefferson counties as well as a southwestern portion of Lancaster County.

District 33
In the pre-1964 apportionment, what is now District 33 was called District 31, and it consisted of the counties of Kearney and Adams. In the 1964 reapportionment, it was reduced to just Adams County. The boundaries of the district were unaffected by the 1966 reapportionment, 1971 redistricting, and 1981 redistricting. After the 1991 redistricting, District 33 gained the southwestern half of Hall County. In the 2001 and 2011 redistrictings, the district continued to expand into Hall County.

Today, as a result of the 2021 redistricting, District 33 contains all of Adams and Kearney counties and a large portion of Phelps County.

District 34
In the pre-1964 apportionment, what is now District 34 was called District 25, and it consisted of the counties of Polk, Hamilton, and Clay. In the 1964 reapportionment, the district lost Clay County but gained all of Merrick County. The boundaries of the district were unaffected by the 1966 reapportionment, but in the 1971 redistricting, District 34 regained Clay County and also added the northern half of Nuckolls County while losing the eastern half of Polk County. In the 1981 redistricting, the district gave up its share of Nuckolls County and expanded into portions of Hall County and further portions of Polk County. In the 1991 redistricting, the District 34 lost all of its area in Polk County and gained more in Hall County. After the 2001 redistricting, the district had lost Clay County but it had gained Nance and regained the northwestern half of Polk County. In the 2011 redistricting, the district gained more area in Hall County but lost all of its area in Polk County again.

Today, District 34 contains all of Hamilton, Merrick, and Nance counties along with the northeast corner of Hall County excluding the city of Grand Island.

District 35
In the pre-1964 apportionment, what is now District 35 was called District 30, and it consisted of the counties of Hall and Merrick. In the 1964 reapportionment, the district was reduced to just Hall County, and in the 1966 reapportionment, the district was further reduced to just the northeastern corner of Hall County, which contains the city of Grand Island. 

Today, District 35 consists of just the portion of Hall County containing Grand Island, which has been adjusted for population in subsequent redistrictings.

District 36
In the pre-1964 apportionment, what is now District 36 was called District 34, and it consisted of the counties of Sherman and Buffalo. In the 1964 reapportionment, the district was reduced to just Buffalo County, and in the 1966 reapportionment, it added the northwest corner of Hall County. In the 1971 redistricting, District 36 was shifted to include only the eastern half of Buffalo County and most of Hall County, excluding the City of Grand Island and the northern edge of Hall County. However, in the 1981 redistricting, District 36 lost area in the southeast corner of Hall County but gained back all of Buffalo County except for the City of Kearney. After the 1991 redistricting, the district began to shift west, losing all of its area in Hall County but gaining all of Dawson and the southwest corner of Sherman County. In the 2001 redistricting, District 36 lost all of its area in Sherman County and also the southwest corner of Dawson County. In the 2011 redistricting, it regained all of Dawson County, lost all but a northern section of Buffalo County, and added all of the sizeable Custer County. In the 2021 redistricting, District 36 was moved completely to Sarpy County.

Today, District 36 consists of roughly the southwest half of Sarpy County.

District 37
In the pre-1964 apportionment, what is now District 37 was called District 32, and it consisted of the counties of Franklin, Webster, and Nuckolls. In the 1964 reapportionment, District 37 gained Kearney County, and in the 1966 reapportionment, it gained the eastern half of Harlan County. In the 1971 redistricting, the district lost its eastern half of Harlan County and the northern Half of Nuckolls County but gained a slice in the western part of Buffalo County. In the 1981 redistricting, District 37 regained all of Nuckolls County, but lost its area in Buffalo County except for the City of Kearney. After the 1991 redistricting, the district was resituated to include only Kearney County and the part of Buffalo County containing the City of Kearney. District 37 was unaffected by the 2001 redistricting, but in the 2011 redistricting, it lost Kearney County and was reduced to the southeast portion of Buffalo County which contained the City of Kearney. In the 2021 redistricting, District 37 was further reduced to the area around the City of Kearney.

Today, District 37 contains a portion of Buffalo County which contains the City of Kearney.

District 38
In the pre-1964 apportionment, what is now District 38 was called District 33, and it consisted of the counties of Red Willow, Furnas, and Harlan. The district was unaffected by the 1964 reapportionment, but in the 1966 reapportionment, it gained Frontier and Gosper counties but lost the eastern half of Harlan County. As a result of the 1971 redistricting, District 38 regained all of Harlan County as well as the eastern half of Hayes County. In the 1981 redistricting, it lost its area in Hayes County but gained a substantial southern portion of Lincoln County. In the 1991 redistricting, the district was shifted substantially eastward, losing all of Frontier and Red Willow counties as well as its area in Lincoln County and a small slice on the western edge of Furnas County; however, it gained Phelps, Franklin, and Webster counties as well as a majority portion of Nuckolls County. With the 2001 redistricting, District 38 continued its shift eastward by losing Furnas County but acquiring all of Nuckolls County and adding Clay County. In the 2011 redistricting, the district yet again moved eastward, losing Gosper and Harlan counties but gaining Kearney County and the southwest part of Buffalo County. As a result of the 2021 redistricting, District 38 began to move westward again, regaining its original three counties, Harlan, Furnas, and Red Willow counties, but losing its area in Buffalo County, most of its area in Phelps County except for a portion containing the City of Holdrege, and all of Kearney County.

Today, District 38 consists of Red Willow, Furnas, Harlan, Franklin, Webster, Nuckolls, and Clay counties as well as the portion of Phelps County containing the City of Holdrege.

District 39
In the pre-1964 apportionment, what is now District 39 was called District 36, and it consisted of the counties of Dawson, Gosper, and Phelps. The district was unaffected by the 1964 reapportionment, but in the 1966 reapportionment, District 39 lost Gosper County. In the redistricting of 1971, the district gained a thin slice on the western edge of Buffalo County, but that area of Buffalo County was then lost in the redistricting of 1981. As a result of the redistricting of 1991, District 39 was moved to the central part of Douglas County where it contained mostly Douglas County and a very little bit of northern Sarpy County. In the 2001 redistricting, District 39 was extended North to include the southwestern corner of Washington County. After the 2011 redistricting, the district was shifted completely into Douglas County.

Today, District 39 consists of a portion of Douglas County on its western side.

District 40
In the pre-1964 apportionment, what is now District 40 was called District 28, and it consisted of the counties of Keya Paha, Rock, Boyd, and Holt. In the 1964 reapportionment, the district was relabeled as District 42, but its boundaries remained unchanged. In the 1966 reapportionment, the district was again relabeled as District 40 and was shifted slightly eastward, losing Keya Paha and Rock counties but gaining Wheeler and Antelope counties. In the 1971 redistricting, District 40 lost Wheeler County but gained a substantial northern portion of Boone County. In the 1981 redistricting, the district gained even more area in Boone County such that the district now contained about three quarters of Boone County except the southeastern corner. As a result of the 1991 redistricting, District 40 lost all of its area in Boone County but added almost all of Knox County except for a small section in the southeast corner. In the 2001 redistricting, the district shifted substantially eastward, losing Boyd and Antelope counties as well as the western half of Holt county, but it gained all the area of Knox County as well as Pierce and Cedar counties. In the 2011 redistricting, District 40 regained Boyd County and all of Holt County, gained Rock and Dixon counties, and lost Pierce County. After the 2021 redistricting, District 40 lost Rock and Boyd counties again as well as a southern portion of Dixon County, but it gained Antelope County and the northern half of Pierce County.

Today, District 40 consists of the entirety of Holt, Knox, Antelope, and Cedar counties as well as most of Dixon County and the northern half of Pierce County.

District 41
In the pre-1964 apportionment, what is now District 41 was called District 29, and it consisted of the counties of Wheeler, Valley, Greeley, and Howard. In the 1964 reapportionment, the district lost Wheeler County and gained Sherman. In the 1966 reapportionment, Boone County was added to the district. In the 1971 redistricting, District 41 lost Boone County but gained all of Loup, Garfield County, Nebraska, and Wheeler counties as well as the northeast corner of Custer County and the northern edge of Hall County. In the 1981 redistricting, District 41 was largely unaffected, with only slight changes to its boundaries within Custer and Hall counties. After the 1991 redistricting, the district lost Loup county as well as part of its area in Sherman County and most of its area in Custer County except for a small carve-out. However, the district gained most of Boone County except for a part in the southeast corner and added to its territory in Hall County. In the 2001 redistricting, the district gained back all of Sherman County, gained the remainder of Boone County, and added Antelope County while slightly adjusting its boundaries in Hall County. In the 2011 redistricting, District 41 gave up all of its area in Hall County but added Pierce County. After the 2021 redistricting, the district shifted southward, losing Garfield, Antelope, and Pierce counties, but gaining most of Buffalo County, except for an area around the City of Kearney, and most of Hall County, except for an area around the City of Grand Island.

Today, District 41 consists of the entirety of Wheeler, Boone, Valley, Greeley, Sherman, and Howard counties as well as most of Buffalo County, except for the area around the city of Kearney comprised by District 37, and most of Hall County except for the area around the city of Grand Island comprised by Districts 34 and 35.

District 42
In the pre-1964 apportionment, what is now District 42 was called District 35, and it consisted of the counties of Loup, Garfield, and Custer. In the 1964 reapportionment, the district was relabeled as District 40 and shifted slightly westward; it lost Garfield County but gained the counties of Hooker, Thomas, Blaine, McPherson, and Logan. In the 1966 reapportionment, the district was again relabeled as District 42 and expanded by regaining Garfield County and adding Garden and Arthur counties. In the 1971 redistricting, District 42 was substantially reorganized and moved slightly southward to consist of only Lincoln County and a small western section of Custer County. As a result of the 1981 redistricting, the area of District 42 was reduced to only include a substantial northeastern portion of Lincoln County, including the City of North Platte. In the 1991 redistricting, the district was expanded to include all of Lincoln County, and its area remained unaffected by the 2001 and 2011 redistrictings. In the 2021 redistricting, District 42 gained Hooker, Thomas, McPherson, and Logan counties along with three quarters of Perkins County.

Today, District 42 consists of the entirety of Lincoln, Hooker, McPherson, Thomas, and Logan counties as well as three quarters of Perkins county, excluding its southwest corner.

District 43
In the pre-1964 apportionment, what is now District 43 was called District 40, and it consisted of the counties of Sheridan, Cherry, and Brown. It was unaffected in the 1964 reapportionment, but in the 1966 reapportionment, the counties of Grant, Rock, and Keya Paha were added. In the 1971 redistricting, District 43 lost its western counties of Sheridan and Grant but it gained a number of counties to the south, including Hooker, Thomas, Blaine, McPherson, and  Logan as well as most of Custer. In the 1981 redistricting, District 43 was unaffected except that the shape of the portion of Custer County contained within it was altered. As a result of the 1991 redistricting, the district gained Grant and Loup counties as well as a portion of Sheridan County. It also gained most of Custer County except for a small carve-out on the east side. During the 2001 redistricting, the district shifted slightly eastward, giving up Grant County, its portion of Sheridan County, and the western edge of Cherry County, but adding the last little bit of Custer County as well as all of Boyd County and half of Holt County. In the 2011 redistricting, District 43 shifted back westward, regaining the western edge of Cherry County and gaining all of Grant and Sheridan counties along with an eastern portion of Box Butte County while losing its area in Holt County and all of Boyd, Rock, and Custer counties. In the 2021 redistricting, District 43 lost its area in Box Butte County and many of its counties in the southern part of the district, including Grant, Hooker, Thomas, McPherson, and Logan counties. On its eastern side, it added Boyd, Rock, Garfield, and Custer counties.

Today, District 43 consists of Dawes, Sheridan, Cherry, Keya Paha, Boyd, Brown, Rock, Blaine, Loup, Garfield, and Custer counties.

District 44
In the pre-1964 apportionment, what is now District 44 was called District 39, and it consisted of the counties of Garden, Deuel, Grant, Arthur, Keith, Hooker, McPherson, Thomas, Logan, and Blaine. In the 1964 reapportionment, the district shifted substantially westward, losing the eastern counties of Blaine, Thomas, Logan, Hooker, and McPherson but gaining Morrill County to the west. In the 1966 reapportionment, the district again shifted substantially, but this time to the south to absorb most of the previous District 46 which was moved. The district lost all of its counties except for Deuel and Keith counties, but it gained Perkins, Chase, Dundy, Hayes, and Hitchcock counties. In the 1971 redistricting, District 44 lost the eastern half of Hayes County but regained Arthur and Garden counties to the north. In the 1981 redistricting, it regained all of Hayes County as well as all of Grant County and a western portion of Lincoln County, but it lost Garden County. As a result of the 1991 redistricting, District 44 lost its northern counties of Deuel, Grant, Arthur, and Keith as well as its area in Lincoln County, but it gained Frontier and Red Willow counties as well as a thin western slice of Furnas County. In the 2001 redistricting, District 44 gained all of Furnas County and a triangular portion of the southwest corner of Dawson County. After the 2011 redistricting, the district lost its area in Dawson County but gained Gosper and Harlan counties. In the 2021 redistricting, District 44 lost Harlan, Furnas, and Red Willow counties as well as three quarters of Perkins County, except for the southwest corner, but it gained Dawson County.

Today, District 44 consists of the southwest quarter of Perkins County as well as the entirety of Chase, Dundy, Hayes, Hitchcock, Frontier, Dawson, and Gosper counties.

District 45
In the pre-1964 apportionment, what is now District 45 was called District 38, and it consisted of the counties of Lincoln and Frontier. In the 1964 reapportionment, it was reduced to just Lincoln County. District 45 was unaffected by the 1966 reapportionment, but in the 1971 redistricting, it was moved completely to the eastern side of Sarpy County, where it has remained.

Today, District 45 consists of an eastern portion of Sarpy County, which has been readjusted for population in subsequent redistrictings.

District 46
In the pre-1964 apportionment, what is now District 46 was called District 37, and it consisted of the counties of Perkins, Chase, Dundy, Hayes, and Hitchcock. In the 1964 reapportionment, Frontier County was added to the district, but in the 1966 reapportionment, District 46 was moved completely to Lancaster County, where it has remained.

Today, District 46 consists of a portion of Lancaster County, which has been readjusted for population in subsequent redistrictings. It mostly includes the northwest part of the City of Lincoln.

District 47
In the pre-1964 apportionment, what is now District 47 was called District 43, and it consisted of the counties of Banner, Kimball, Morrill, and Cheyenne. In the 1964 reapportionment, the district lost Morrill County, but in the 1966 reapportionment, it gained the western half of Scotts Bluff County. In the 1971 redistricting, District 47 regained Morrill County and also gained more area in Scotts Bluff County, consisting of the eastern and western thirds, but not the central third, of the county. In the 1981 redistricting, the district continued to grow by gaining Garden County. As a result of the 1991 redistricting, the district gained three more counties, Arthur, Deuel, and Keith, but it lost Banner County and all of its area in Scotts Bluff County. In the 2001 redistricting, District 47 regained Banner County, and in the 2011 redistricting, it added Sioux County and most of Box Butte County except for the eastern edge. In the 2021 redistricting, District 47 lost Banner and Kimball counties but gained all of Box Butte County as well as Grant County.

Today, District 47 consists of Sioux, Box Butte, Morrill, Cheyenne, Garden, Deuel, Grant, Arthur, and Keith counties.

District 48
In the pre-1964 apportionment, what is now District 48 was called District 42, and it consisted of Scotts Bluff County. In the 1964 reapportionment, the district was unaffected, but in the 1966 reapportionment, it was reduced to only include the eastern half of Scotts Bluff County, including the city of Scottsbluff. In the 1971 redistricting, it was further reduced to include the central third of Scotts Bluff County, retaining the city of Scottsbluff. Though the district was readjusted for population in 1981, 1991, and 2001, it still consisted of a portion of central Scotts Bluff County. In the 2011 redistricting, District 48 was expanded to once again include all of Scotts Bluff County. In the 2021 redistricting, Banner and Kimball counties were added to the district.

Today, District 48 consists of Scotts Bluff, Banner, and Kimball counties.

District 49
In the pre-1964 apportionment, what is now District 49 was called District 41, and it consisted of the counties of Sioux, Dawes, and Box Butte. The district was unaffected by the 1964 reapportionment, but in the 1966 reapportionment, it gained Morrill County. In the 1971 redistricting, District 49 lost Morrill County but gained Sheridan and Grant counties. As a result of the 1981 redistricting, the district lost Grant County. In the 1991 redistricting, District 49 lost a portion of Sheridan County but gained all of Banner County and eastern and western portions of Scotts Bluff County, not including the City of Scottsbluff. After the 2001 redistricting, District 49 lost Banner County but regained all of Sheridan County as well as Grant County and a western slice of Cherry County. As a result of the 2011 redistricting, the district was moved completely to the northwest corner of Sarpy County.

Today, District 49 consists of a portion of Sarpy County, which has been readjusted for population in subsequent redistrictings.

References
In the tables above: 
An election year in italics indicates that a special election was held to fill a vacancy in what would not otherwise have been an election year for that district.

Sources included
The Nebraska Blue Book, which is published every other year, lists each state senator as well as their home address and sometimes party affiliation. Blue books from http://nebraskaccess.nebraska.gov/bluebookbios.asp were consulted extensively for the lists above.
District maps for each year can also be found in the Nebraska Blue Book from https://nebraskaccess.nebraska.gov/LegPastPresent/LegMaps.asp.

References

Nebraska Legislature
Senators